Mud Lake is a reservoir within the Mud Lake Wildlife Management Area on the Snake River Plain in north-central Jefferson County, Idaho, United States. Its primary inflow is Camas Creek (including the creek's primary tributary, Beaver Creek). It has no outflow other than evaporation, seepage, and irrigation canals. Originally a sump, the lake gradually got smaller and deeper as dikes were built around it.

See also
 List of dams and reservoirs in Idaho

References

External links

Reservoirs in Idaho
Lakes of Jefferson County, Idaho